Blanchard Township is one of the seventeen townships of Hancock County, Ohio, United States. As of the 2010 census the population was 1,123, of whom 824 lived in the unincorporated portions of the township.

Geography
Located in the western part of the county, it borders the following townships:
Pleasant Township - north
Portage Township - northeast corner
Liberty Township - east
Eagle Township - southeast corner
Union Township - south
Riley Township, Putnam County - southwest corner
Blanchard Township, Putnam County - west
Van Buren Township, Putnam County - northwest corner

The village of Benton Ridge is located in southeastern Blanchard Township.

Name and history
Statewide, other Blanchard Townships are located in Hardin and Putnam counties.

Blanchard Township was organized in 1831. The township was named for a stream that runs through it.

Government
The township is governed by a three-member board of trustees, who are elected in November of odd-numbered years to a four-year term beginning on the following January 1. Two are elected in the year after the presidential election and one is elected in the year before it. There is also an elected township fiscal officer, who serves a four-year term beginning on April 1 of the year after the election, which is held in November of the year before the presidential election. Vacancies in the fiscal officership or on the board of trustees are filled by the remaining trustees.

References

External links

Townships in Hancock County, Ohio
Townships in Ohio